Pajala is a locality and the seat of Pajala Municipality in Norrbotten County, Sweden, with 1,958 inhabitants in 2010. It is located in Swedish Lapland.

Pajala is in the Torne Valley and was dominated by people speaking a Finnish dialect until Eastern Sweden (Finland) got annexed by Russia in the 1800s and Pajala ended on the Swedish side of the river that marked the border. Today the town is nearly unilingually Swedish although the Meänkieli name for the locality remains in use and is a minority language. Even so, Pajala has belonged to Sweden since the country's inception as a political unit.

History
Lars Levi Laestadius, a botanist, Lutheran minister, and founder of the revivalist movement Laestadianism, lived and worked in Pajala municipality in the mid-19th century. He lived in Kengis, but in 1869 his house and grave and the whole church of Kengis were moved to Pajala.

The town was mistakenly bombed by Soviet airplanes during the Finnish/Soviet Winter War, in spring 1940. Seven Soviet planes dropped 134 bombs, a mix of explosive and firebombs, which destroyed six buildings, badly damaging telephone wires, and making the streets impossible to drive on due to 43 big craters. No human deaths were recorded, although two persons were slightly injured. Soviet officers later inspected the destruction and the Soviet Union paid damages to Sweden in 1940.

Literature about Pajala 
The events in Mikael Niemi's book "Populärmusik från Vittula" (Popular Music from Vittula) occur mainly in Pajala. Vittula, or more properly Vittulajänkkä,  is a colloquial name (vulgar in its Finnish-Sami etymology, at least) for a certain garden suburb in Pajala.

In another portrait of Pajala by Niemi, the crime novel "Mannen som dog som en lax" ("The Man who Died like a Salmon"), the author discusses the state of the minority language Meänkieli in Pajala today.

Climate 
Pajala has a harsh subarctic climate that is somewhat moderated by the influence of the North Atlantic. Its inland position and lower elevation cause warmer summers, and winters are a bit less cold than most areas on similar latitudes.

References 

Populated places in Pajala Municipality
Norrbotten
Municipal seats of Norrbotten County
Swedish municipal seats
Populated places in Arctic Sweden